The Endeavour 33 is an American sailboat, that was designed by Bruce Kelley and first built in 1983.

Production
The design was built by Endeavour Yacht Corporation in the United States between 1983 and 1986, but it is now out of production.

Design
The Endeavour 33 is a small recreational keelboat, built predominantly of fiberglass, with wood trim. It has a masthead sloop rig, a raked stem, a near-vertical transom, a skeg-mounted rudder controlled by a wheel and a fixed fin keel. It displaces  and carries  of ballast.

The design has a PHRF racing average handicap of 168 with a high of 180 and low of 162.

See also
List of sailing boat types

Similar sailboats
Abbott 33
Alajuela 33
Arco 33
C&C 3/4 Ton
C&C 33
C&C 101
C&C SR 33
Cape Dory 33
Cape Dory 330
CS 33
Hans Christian 33
Hunter 33
Hunter 33-2004
Hunter 33.5
Hunter 333
Hunter 336
Hunter 340
Marlow-Hunter 33
Mirage 33
Moorings 335
Nonsuch 33
Tanzer 10
Viking 33
Watkins 33

References

External links

Keelboats
1980s sailboat type designs
Sailing yachts
Sailboat type designs by Bruce Kelley
Sailboat types built by Endeavour Yacht Corporation